Rohit Shah (born 27 December 1997) is an Indian cricketer. He made his Twenty20 debut on 17 January 2021, for Meghalaya in the 2020–21 Syed Mushtaq Ali Trophy. He made his List A debut on 21 February 2021, for Meghalaya in the 2020–21 Vijay Hazare Trophy.

References

External links
 

1997 births
Living people
Indian cricketers
Meghalaya cricketers
Place of birth missing (living people)